Jafargulu agha Javanshir (1787–1866) was an Azerbaijani poet and public figure and was a major-general of the Russian Army.

Biography
Javargulu Agha was born in 1787, in Shusha. He was the elder son of Mammadhasan agha Javanshir, a major-general of the Russian army and legatee of Ibrahimkhalil khan of Karabakh. After his father's death in November 1805, “he was recognized as a legal heir of the Karabakh Khanate by the Russian government” and conferred a gold medal with the inscription “Karabakh’s Legatee”.

Nevertheless, Jafargulu Agha's uncle major-general Mehdigulu khan was promoted to khan of Karabakh “for political reasons” by a supreme order, after the murder of Ibrahim Khalil khan, by lieutenant-colonel Lisanevich in 1806.

Jafargulu Agha was especially distinguished during the Russo-Persian War on 1804–1813, when he destroyed Iranians under Ordubad and Qafan, in 1806, by commanding horse cavalry of Karabakh. On January 2, 1807 he was promoted directly to colonel by a supreme order.

On February 20, 1820 colonel Jafargulu Agha was conferred a golden gun “with diamonds and jewel adornments” with a ligature “For Courage”.

Mehdigulu khan carried on a struggle against him, but in the issue he was forced to escape to Iran. Karabakh khanate was abolished and became a province of Russia. Jafargulu Agha wrote poems under a pseudonym “Nava”.

Jafargulu agha died in 1867 and was buried in an ancestral cemetery, in Shusha.

Family
He was married twice:

 Ajaibnisa khanum (daughter of Tuni bey from Banazur, an Armenian)
 Abdullapasha agha (c. 1803 – before 1860) married his own cousin Gullü begüm (daughter of Khanjan agha, his uncle), had 5 daughters
 Karim agha (c. 1807 – c. 1852)
 Yetar khanim (daughter of Huseyngulu beg).
 Hidayat agha (c. 1823 – c. 1888) married Sharafjahan begüm (b. 1836), daughter of Abra Khan (son of Jafarqoli khan Donboli) and Azad Begüm (daughter of Ibrahimkhalil khan)

References

1787 births
Writers from Shusha
1866 deaths
Azerbaijani nobility
19th-century Azerbaijani poets
Imperial Russian Army generals
People of the Russo-Persian Wars
Azerbaijani-language poets
19th-century male writers
Military personnel from Shusha